Public School No. 25, also known as Captain Henry Fleete School, named for one of the earliest and most influential colonizers of Maryland, Henry Fleete Sr., and Primary School No. 25, is a historic elementary school located at Baltimore, Maryland, United States. It is a late Victorian brick structure with an imposing Romanesque tower. It is a two-story, brick structure with a ground-level basement and features a central three-story tower capped by a pyramidal roof.  It served a school for nearly 75 years.

Public School No. 25 was listed on the National Register of Historic Places in 1979.

References

External links

, including photo from 1978, at Maryland Historical Trust

Defunct schools in Maryland
Public schools in Baltimore
Fell's Point, Baltimore
School buildings on the National Register of Historic Places in Baltimore
School buildings completed in 1892
Romanesque Revival architecture in Maryland
Victorian architecture in Maryland
1892 establishments in Maryland